Bălașa is a Romanian surname. Notable people with the surname include:

Cristian Bălașa (born 1972), Romanian football player and manager
Daniel Bălașa (born 1981), Romanian footballer
Mihai Bălașa (born 1995), Romanian footballer
Sabin Bălașa (1932–2008), Romanian painter

See also
Valentín Balaša
Balassa

Romanian-language surnames